Quercus berberidifolia, the California scrub oak, is a small evergreen or semi-evergreen shrubby oak in the white oak section of Quercus. It is a native of the scrubby hills of California, and is a common member of chaparral ecosystems.

Description
In cooler, more exposed areas, scrub oak is usually a small, compact shrub, but in warm or sheltered areas the plant can spread out and grow several meters high.

The epithet berberidifolia means "barberry-leaved," referring to the spiny leaf margins characteristic of Q. berberidifolia as well as of several species of Berberis.

Other species

The species is often known simply as scrub oak, though this name is also applied to other Quercus species, especially several which were formerly grouped under the single name Q. dumosa; all are found in scrubby habitats. Many other scrub-type oaks may be found in these regions, and careful inspection is required to identify individuals of Q. berberidifolia and its hybrids.

Quercus berberidifolia sometimes hybridizes with other species.

Chaparral origins
The word chaparral is derived from the Spanish word for scrub oak, chaparro. The non-specific meaning of the term is 'short in stature.'
Because most scrub vegetation is rather low growing, the term is broadly applied to all of the vegetation in chaparral communities.

References

External links
 
 New York Times article: Oldest Scrub Oak through self cloning

berberidifolia
Endemic flora of California
Natural history of the California chaparral and woodlands
Natural history of the California Coast Ranges
Natural history of the Channel Islands of California
Natural history of the Peninsular Ranges
Natural history of the San Francisco Bay Area
Natural history of the Santa Monica Mountains
Natural history of the Transverse Ranges
Plants described in 1854
Garden plants of North America